"Taste (Make It Shake)" is a song recorded by British rapper Aitch, released as the lead single from Aitch's second extended play AitcH20 on 31 July 2019. The song was written by Aitch, Jake Jones, James Murray and Mustafa Omer, and produced by Whyjay.

A remix featuring Stefflon Don and Fenix Flexin was released on 30 August 2019. And an Australian remix featuring Hooligan Hefs and Nerve which was released on 1 November 2019.

Commercially, the song became Aitch's first solo chart appearance on the UK Singles Chart when it debuted at number eight on 9 August 2019 – for the week ending dated 15 August 2019. It eventually peaked at number two.

Charts

Weekly charts

Year-end charts

Certifications

Release history

References

Aitch (rapper) songs

External links

2019 singles
2019 songs
Songs written by Mustafa Omer